Yongji may refer to:

Yongji, Shanxi, formerly Yongji County
Yongji County, Jilin
 Yongji, Leiyang, a town of Leiyang City, Hunan.
Yongji, (1755–1776), 12th son of the Qianlong Emperor and eldest son of Empress Nara